Oleksandr Yarovyi (born 27 June 1999) is a Ukrainian Paralympic athlete who specializes in shot put. He represented Ukraine at the 2020 Summer Paralympics.

Career
Yarovyi represented Ukraine in the shot put F20 event at the 2020 Summer Paralympics and won a silver medal.

References

1999 births
Living people
People from Kremenchuk
Paralympic athletes of Ukraine
Medalists at the World Para Athletics European Championships
Athletes (track and field) at the 2020 Summer Paralympics
Medalists at the 2020 Summer Paralympics
Paralympic medalists in athletics (track and field)
Paralympic silver medalists for Ukraine
Ukrainian male shot putters
Sportspeople from Poltava Oblast